Ángel Montoro may refer to:
Ángel Montoro (footballer) (born 1988), Spanish footballer
Ángel Montoro (handballer) (born 1989), Spanish handballer